Raja Nasir Ali Khan Maqpoon is a Pakistani politician who is Minister of Tourism GB and member-elect of the Gilgit Baltistan Assembly.

Political career
Maqpoon contested the 2020 Gilgit-Baltistan Assembly election on 15 November 2020 from constituency GBA-10 (Skardu-IV) as an Independent candidate. He won the election by the margin of 1,323 votes over the runner up Wazir Hassan of Pakistan Tehreek-e-Insaf (PTI). He garnered 4,667 votes while Hassan received 3,344 votes. After winning the election, Maqpoon joined PTI.

References

Living people
Gilgit-Baltistan MLAs 2020–2025
Politicians from Gilgit-Baltistan
Year of birth missing (living people)